Qovaq-e Olya or Qavaq-e Olya may refer to:
 Qavaq-e Olya, East Azerbaijan
 Qovaq-e Olya, Zanjan